Henryk VIII may refer to

 Henry VIII of Legnica (ca. 1355 – 1398)
 Henry VIII the Sparrow (ca. 1357 – 1397)